

Waermund (or Wærmund) was a medieval Bishop of Worcester. He was consecrated in 775. He died in 777.

Citations

References

External links
 

Bishops of Worcester
777 deaths
8th-century English bishops
Year of birth unknown